Lockley Newport Boats was an American boat builder based in Newport Beach, California. The company specialized in the design and manufacture of fiberglass sailboats.

The company was founded in 1964 and went though several name changes and changes of ownership prior to going out of business in 1988.

History

The company was founded as Newport Boats in 1964, building a line of sailing dinghies and small daysailers. An east coast factory was established in Gloucester, Virginia to provide boats for that market.

The company was acquired by the Browning Arms Company, a firearms manufacturer and later by Elgin International. In 1976 the company was bought by Lockley Manufacturing and was renamed Lockley Newport Boats. In 1981 the name was changed again to Gloucester Yachts. The company went out of business in 1988.

The molds for a number of the designs built by the company were later bought by Classic Yachts of Chanute, Kansas and produced, including the Gloucester 22 and the Lockley-Newport LN-23, which were built until 2000.

In a series of 2010 boat reviews Steve Henkel criticized the company's work, calling the quality of construction "so-so", noting that they were aimed at a budget market and that "the low cost is obtained partly by offering what is usually standard equipment as optional".

Boats 
Summary of boats built by Newport Boats, Lockley Newport Boats and Gloucester Yachts:

Albacore (dinghy) - 1964
Finn (dinghy) - 1964
Flying Dutchman - 1964
Lightning (dinghy) - 1964
Mobjack (dinghy) - 1964
Pacific Catamaran - 1964
Windmill (sailing dinghy) - 1964
Kite (sailboat) - 1965
Newport 16 - 1965
Skipjack 15 - 1965
Buccaneer 18 - 1968
Flipper (US dinghy) - 1968
Newport 20 - 1968
Surprise 15 - 1969
Blue Crab 11 - 1971
Bullet 14 - 1971
Newport 212 - 1972
Holiday 20 - 1973
Newport 17 - 1974
Newport 214 - 1975
Harmony 22 - 1977
Lockley-Newport LN-23 - 1978
Lockley-Newport LN-27 - 1979
Gloucester 20 - 1981
Gloucester 19 - 1983
Gloucester 22 - 1983
Gloucester 27 - 1983
Gloucester 18 (Whitecap) - 1984
Gloucester 18 - 1985
Gloucester 16 - 1986
Gloucester 15 - 1987

See also
List of sailboat designers and manufacturers

References

Newport Boats